Valley Stream North High School (VSNHS) is a combined public junior and senior high school located in the hamlet of Franklin Square, New York in southwest Nassau County on Long Island.

Valley Stream North High School is one of three high schools in the Valley Stream Central High School District. Like Valley Stream South High School, Valley Stream North High School is a combined junior-senior high school that educates grades seven through twelve. Students who attend Valley Stream North High School are mainly graduates of the local Franklin Square, North Valley Stream, and Elmont elementary schools, including Willow Road Elementary School, James A. Dever Elementary School, and Howell Road Elementary School.  Students who attend Valley Stream North High School reside in either Franklin Square, Malverne, North Valley Stream, or Elmont. Valley Stream North High School is known to the local population simply as "North."

As of the 2014–15 school year, the school had an enrollment of 1,281 students and 95.8 classroom teachers (on an FTE basis), for a student–teacher ratio of 13.4:1. There were 178 students (13.9% of enrollment) eligible for free lunch and 43 (3.4% of students) eligible for reduced-cost lunch.

Notable alumni
Rich Borresen, former NFL player
Jim Ferry, Assistant Coach of Men's Basketball at Penn State
Alice Hoffman, American novelist and young-adult and children's writer
Atoosa Rubenstein, magazine editor
Rick Shutter, drummer and percussionist in the original New York production of Godspell
Mike Witteck, former NFL player

References

External links
Valley Stream North High School website
Valley Stream North High School Football Website
High School Student Publification North Star Website

Public high schools in New York (state)
Valley Stream, New York
Schools in Nassau County, New York
Public middle schools in New York (state)

Educational institutions established in 1955
1955 establishments in New York (state)